Ondřej Mohout (born 1959) is a former Czechoslovak slalom canoeist who competed at the international level from 1984 to 1990.

He won two medals in the C2 team event at the ICF Canoe Slalom World Championships with a gold in 1985 and a silver in 1987.

His partner in the C2 boat from 1984 to 1989 was Viktor Beneš.

References

Czechoslovak male canoeists
Living people
1959 births
Medalists at the ICF Canoe Slalom World Championships